Jwaneng Airport  is an airport serving Jwaneng, a town in the Southern District of Botswana. It is owned by Debswana, which also owns the Jwaneng diamond mine. There is no scheduled airline service.

The Jwaneng non-directional beacon (Ident: JWN) is located on the field.

See also

Transport in Botswana
List of airports in Botswana

References

External links
OpenStreetMap - Jwaneng
OurAirports - Jwaneng
SkyVector - Jwaneng

Airports in Botswana
Southern District (Botswana)